Rustia occidentalis is a species of flowering plant in the family Rubiaceae, native to Central America (Costa Rica, the Central American Pacific Islands, Guatemala, Nicaragua and Panama), as well as to Colombia and Ecuador in western South America. It was first described by George Bentham in 1845 as Exostema occidentale and transferred to Rustia in 1881 by William Hemsley.

References

occidentalis
Flora of Costa Rica
Flora of the Central American Pacific Islands
Flora of Guatemala
Flora of Nicaragua
Flora of Panama
Flora of Colombia
Flora of Ecuador
Plants described in 1845